Geoffery Burnside (born 5 November 1950) is a former Bahamian cyclist. He competed in the sprint event at the 1972 Summer Olympics.

References

External links
 

1950 births
Living people
Bahamian male cyclists
Olympic cyclists of the Bahamas
Cyclists at the 1972 Summer Olympics
Place of birth missing (living people)